Acacia chrysopoda is a shrub of the genus Acacia and the subgenus Plurinerves that is endemic to an area of south western Australia.

Description
It has branchlets that are covered in golden or white coloured hairs on young growth. Like most species of Acacia it has phyllodes rather than true leaves. The grey-green coloured phyllodes are crowded at the ends of the branchlets and have a linear to linear-oblanceolate shape. It blooms in July and produces yellow flowers. The simple inflorescences occur singly or in pairs in the axils and have spherical flower-heads with a diameter of  containing 30 to 45 light golden coloured flowers.

Taxonomy
The species was first formally described in 1928 by the botanists Joseph Maiden and William Blakely as part of the work  Descriptions of fifty new species and six varieties of western and northern Australian Acacias, and notes on four other species as published in the Journal of the Royal Society of Western Australia. It was reclassified as Racosperma chrysopodum by Leslie Pedley in 2003 then transferred back to genus Acacia in 2006.

Distribution
It is native to an area in the Wheatbelt and Goldfields-Esperance regions of Western Australia growing in sandy, clay or loamy granitic soils. The shrub has a limited distribution extending from around Karlgarin in the west to around Lake Cronin in the east and to around Newdegate and Lake King where it is usually a part of Eucalyptus woodland communities.

See also
 List of Acacia species

References

chrysopoda
Acacias of Western Australia
Taxa named by Joseph Maiden
Taxa named by William Blakely
Plants described in 1928